The following is a list of the MuchMusic Video Awards winners for the MuchMoreMusic Award. This award is now defunct, and has not been awarded since 2007.

The category was formerly presented as the MuchMusic Video Award for Adult Contemporary Video, and was renamed the MuchMoreMusic Award with the launch of MuchMoreMusic in 1998.

References

MuchMusic Video Awards
Awards disestablished in 2007
Awards established in 1990